Barand-e Sofla (also Romanized as Bārand-e Soflá; also known as Bārand-e Pā’īn) is a village in Padena-ye Olya Rural District, Padena District, Semirom County, Isfahan Province, Iran. At the 2006 census, its population was 447, in 108 families.

References 

Populated places in Semirom County